The Evictors is a 1979 American crime-horror film written and directed by Charles B. Pierce, and starring Vic Morrow, Michael Parks, and Jessica Harper. A period piece set in 1942, it follows a couple who are terrorized by a mysterious man on the property of their new home in rural Louisiana, which is the site of various unsolved homicides from years prior. Released in April 1979, it was one of the last films distributed by American International Pictures.

Plot
In 1942, a young couple, Ben and Ruth Watkins, purchase a house in a small rural town in Louisiana. Unknown to them, the house has a violent past.  In 1928, the bank foreclosed on the previous owners, the Monroes, which led to a shootout on the property. Ruth and Ben slowly learn that every new resident, since 1928, has met a violent end and now Ruth becomes convinced someone is trying to get them to leave. Ruth is repeatedly terrorized by a mysterious slow-moving lurker when Ben is away. A series of flashbacks show the same lurker murdering several people who move into the house.

Near the end, Ben himself tries to stop the lurker from hurting Ruth only to end up being killed by accident when Ruth attempts to shoot the lurker only to shoot her husband. When Ruth decides to move out, she decides to say goodbye to her neighbors only to discover that the lurker resides in the house next door. The lurker/killer is Dwayne Monroe who lives with Anna, who is actually Olie Monroe. The real estate agent Jake, who sold the house to Ben and Ruth, is actually Todd Monroe who has been running a real estate scam for decades; Jake/Todd Monroe sells the old Monroe house to unsuspecting young couples, while his sister-in-law Anna/Olie Monroe befriends the new tenants to learn more about them, and their brother Dwayne Monroe terrorizes, harasses, and eventually murders the new owners, enabling Jake to buy back the house and live off the sale proceeds which he splits with Olie and Dwayne. During a scuffle, Dwayne murders Olie and then goes after Ruth, only for Jake to shoot and kill him in self-defense.

In the final scene, set five years later in 1947, the now-insane Ruth has married Jake and willingly joins him in his continuing scam of selling the old family house to unsuspecting people, murdering them, and then living off the sale of the property to new owners.

Cast

Release
The Evictors screened in the United States beginning March 30, 1979. It later screened in Nanaimo, British Columbia in October 1979, paired as a double bill with The Amityville Horror (1979).

Critical response
Bill von Maurer of The Miami News wrote: "The Evictors turns out to be a tidy little thriller movie that avoids cliches about haunted houses," but conceded that it "isn't a white-knuckle kind of thriller and it has its weak points you could punch holes, but on the whole you get a generous helping of scares and surprises for a B-grade film."

In a review published in the Time Out film guide, it is noted: "Pierce toiled unspectacularly in the low-budget mills for several years, but scored a bullseye with this energetically ghoulish exploiter which relocates the Old Dark House on Bonnie and Clyde terrain. The plot (city couple buy a lonely farm whose massacred former owners refuse to stay dead) may be perfunctory, but there are likeable performances, nice period details, and terrific set pieces, as well as a final twist incredible enough to be mildly surprising." TV Guides published review, however, deemed the film "worthless exploitation junk," and "just awful."

Film critic and historian John Kenneth Muir called The Evictors a "back-to-the-basics horror film," adding that it "manages to impress, both in terms of its production values (and period detail), and visceral impact."

Home media
Scream Factory has released the film on DVD as a bonus film in the Blu-ray combo pack of The Town That Dreaded Sundown in 2013. It was released as a standalone title by Scream Factory on Blu-ray on June 27, 2017.

References

External links
 

1979 films
1979 horror films
1970s crime films
American crime films
American horror thriller films
Films directed by Charles B. Pierce
Films set in 1942
Films set in 1947
Films set in Louisiana
Home invasions in film
1970s English-language films
1970s American films